A Gilman reagent is a lithium and copper (diorganocopper) reagent compound, R2CuLi, where R is an alkyl or aryl.  These reagents are useful because, unlike related Grignard reagents and organolithium reagents, they react with organic halides to replace the halide group with an R group (the Corey–House reaction).  Such displacement reactions allow for the synthesis of complex products from simple building blocks.

Reactions 
These reagents were discovered by Henry Gilman and coworkers. Lithium dimethylcopper (CH3)2CuLi can be prepared by adding copper(I) iodide to methyllithium in tetrahydrofuran at −78 °C. In the reaction depicted below, the Gilman reagent is a methylating reagent reacting with an alkyne in a conjugate addition, and the negative charge is trapped in a nucleophilic acyl substitution with the ester group forming a cyclic enone.

Due to the softness of the nucleophile, they do 1,4 addition on conjugated enones, rather than 1,2 addition.

Structure
Lithium dimethylcuprate exists as a dimer in diethyl ether forming an 8-membered ring. Similarly, lithium diphenylcuprate crystallizes as a dimeric etherate, .

 

If the Li+ ions is complexed with the crown ether 12-crown-4, the resulting diorganylcuprate anions adopt a linear coordination geometry at copper.

Mixed cuprates
More useful generally than the Gilman reagents are the so-called mixed cuprates with the formula [RCuX]− and [R2CuX]2−.  Such compounds are often prepared by the addition of the organolithium reagent to copper(I) halides and cyanide. These mixed cuprates are more stable and more readily purified. One problem addressed by mixed cuprates is the economical use of the alkyl group. Thus, in some applications, the mixed cuprate has the formula  is prepared by combining thienyllithium and cuprous cyanide followed by the organic group to be transferred. In this higher order mixed cuprate, both the cyanide and thienyl groups do not transfer, only the R group does.

See also
 Organolithium reagent
 Organocopper
 Grignard reagent
 Cuprate (chemistry)

External links
National Pollutant Inventory - Copper and compounds fact sheet

References

Organolithium compounds
Organocopper compounds
Reagents for organic chemistry